Alva Mitchell "Rip" Williams (January 31, 1882 – July 23, 1933) was a reserve infielder in Major League Baseball, playing mainly as a catcher or first baseman for three different teams between the  and  seasons. He was born in Carthage, Illinois.

Basically a line drive hitter and a competent glove man, Williams entered the majors in 1911 with the Boston Red Sox, playing for them one year before joining the Washington Senators (1912–1916) and Cleveland Indians (1918). His most productive season came in 1911 with Boston, when he posted career-numbers in games (95), runs (31), RBI (31) and stolen bases (9). He also hit a career-high .318 in 61 games for the 1912 Senators.

In a seven-season career, Williams was a .265 hitter (314-for-1186) with two home runs and 145 RBI in 498 games, including 111 runs, 51 doubles, 23 triples, 27 stolen bases, and a .328 on-base percentage. He made 364 fielding appearances as a catcher (212), first baseman (144), right fielder (5), third baseman (2) and center field (1).

Williams died at the age of 51 in Keokuk, Iowa.

References

External links

1882 births
1933 deaths
People from Carthage, Illinois
Boston Red Sox players
Cleveland Indians players
Washington Senators (1901–1960) players
Major League Baseball catchers
Major League Baseball first basemen
Baseball players from Illinois
Keokuk Indians players
Terre Haute Hottentots players
Buffalo Bisons (minor league) players
Baltimore Orioles (IL) players